Paranormal Extremes: Text Messages from the Dead is a 2015 American film directed by Ted V. Mikels.

References

External links

2015 films
American horror films
2015 horror films
Films directed by Ted V. Mikels
2010s American films